Scott Ferguson (born January 6, 1973) is a Canadian former Métis professional ice hockey defenceman who played in the National Hockey League (NHL) with the Edmonton Oilers, Mighty Ducks of Anaheim and Minnesota Wild. He was an assistant coach, along with fellow ex-Oiler Geoff Smith, with the Kamloops Blazers. He coached there for three seasons before being let go despite having a 6-2-0 record as the interim head coach at the end of his time with the organization.

Playing career
A great performance for the Kamloops Blazers during the 1993/94 season earned Ferguson a second team all-star berth and a free agent contract from the Edmonton Oilers, which launched his professional career.

After spending most of seven seasons in the minor leagues (with the Cape Breton Oilers, Hamilton Bulldogs and Cincinnati Mighty Ducks), with only three NHL games (with Edmonton and the Mighty Ducks of Anaheim), Ferguson landed a regular job with the Oilers as a sixth/seventh defenceman, where he would play the following three seasons.  Ferguson played in Sweden's HockeyAllsvenskan for Skovde IK during the NHL lockout.

Ferguson signed for the Minnesota Wild after the lockout ended.  He played 15 games for the Wild and spent much of his tenure with their AHL affiliate the Houston Aeros.  He then signed a one-year contract with the San Jose Sharks but was assigned to the Worcester Sharks and never played a game for San Jose.

In total, Ferguson played 218 regular season games in the NHL, scoring 7 goals and 14 assists for 21 points and collecting 310 penalty minutes.  He also played 11 playoff games in two seasons for Edmonton, scoring no points and collecting 8 penalty minutes.

Career statistics

Regular season and playoffs

Awards and honours

Transactions
June 2, 1994 - Edmonton signs Ferguson.
March 9, 1998 - Edmonton trades Ferguson to the Ottawa Senators for Frank Musil.
July 27, 1998 - Anaheim signs Ferguson.
July 5, 2000 - Edmonton signs Ferguson
August 4, 2005 - Minnesota signs Ferguson.
July 14, 2006 - San Jose signs Ferguson.

References

External links

1973 births
Canadian ice hockey defencemen
Canadian people of Scottish descent
Cape Breton Oilers players
Cincinnati Mighty Ducks players
Edmonton Oilers players
ERC Ingolstadt players
Hamilton Bulldogs (AHL) players
Ice hockey people from Alberta
Houston Aeros (1994–2013) players
Kamloops Blazers players
Living people
Mighty Ducks of Anaheim players
Minnesota Wild players
People from Camrose, Alberta
Undrafted National Hockey League players
Wheeling Thunderbirds players
Worcester Sharks players
Métis sportspeople
Canadian expatriate ice hockey players in Germany